In Greek mythology, Eëtion or Eetion (Ēetíōn ) was the king of the Cilician Thebe.

Family 
Eetion was the father of Andromache, wife of Hector, and of seven sons, including Podes.

Mythology 
In Book 6 of the Iliad, Andromache relates that Achilles killed Eëtion and his seven sons in a raid on Thebe, but in Book 17, Podes appears and is killed by Menelaus. This inconsistency on Homer's part may be an implication that some traditions gave Eëtion eight sons.

His wife is never named, but Andromache relates that she was captured in the same raid in which Eëtion was killed, and died of sickness in Troy following her release. However, a certain Astynome, also called Chryseis, was said to be the wife of Eetion at that time. She was carried off by Achilles and later became the war prize of Agamemnon.

Notes

Kings in Greek mythology
Children of Zeus

References 

 Dictys Cretensis, from The Trojan War. The Chronicles of Dictys of Crete and Dares the Phrygian translated by Richard McIlwaine Frazer, Jr. (1931-). Indiana University Press. 1966. Online version at the Topos Text Project.
 Gaius Julius Hyginus, Fabulae from The Myths of Hyginus translated and edited by Mary Grant. University of Kansas Publications in Humanistic Studies. Online version at the Topos Text Project.
 Homer, The Iliad with an English Translation by A.T. Murray, Ph.D. in two volumes. Cambridge, MA., Harvard University Press; London, William Heinemann, Ltd. 1924. . Online version at the Perseus Digital Library.
 Homer, Homeri Opera in five volumes. Oxford, Oxford University Press. 1920. . Greek text available at the Perseus Digital Library.

Characters in the Iliad